The Inter Baku 2008–09 season was Inter Baku's eighth Azerbaijan Premier League season, and their third season under manager Valentin Khodukin. They finished 2nd in the league one point behind champions Baku.

Squad

Transfers

Summer

In:

 

Out:

Winter

In:

Out:

Competitions

Azerbaijan Premier League

Results summary

Results

Table

Azerbaijan Cup

UEFA Champions League

Qualifying rounds

Squad statistics

Appearances and goals

|-
|colspan="14"|Players who left Baku on loan during the season:
|-
|colspan="14"|Players who appeared for Baku who left during the season:

|}

Goal scorers

Notes
On 31 October 2008, FK NBC Salyan changed their name to FK Mughan.
Qarabağ have played their home games at the Tofiq Bahramov Stadium since 1993 due to the ongoing situation in Quzanlı.

References

External links 
 Inter Baku at Soccerway.com
http://www.weltfussball.at/teams/inter-baku/2009/2/
https://web.archive.org/web/20140211091820/http://www.pfl.az/upload/arxiv/200809/oyuncustats200809.pdf
http://www.futbol24.com/national/Azerbaijan/Premier-League/2008-2009/results

Shamakhi FK seasons
Inter Baku